GCCS may refer to:
 Gilboa-Conesville Central School, in New York, United States
 Global Command and Control System
 Global Conference on CyberSpace
 Gloucester County Christian School, in Sewell, New Jersey, United States
 Government Chinese Character Set
 Government Code and Cypher School at Bletchley Park
 Grove City Christian School, in Ohio, United States

See also 
 GCC (disambiguation)